Egerton (previously Devonshire and Egerton, 1973 to 1979) was a Wirral Metropolitan Borough Council ward in the Birkenhead Parliamentary constituency.

It was abolished in 2004, being absorbed into the Bebington, Birkenhead and Tranmere, Prenton and Rock Ferry wards.

Councillors

References

Wards of Merseyside
Birkenhead
Politics of the Metropolitan Borough of Wirral
Wards of the Metropolitan Borough of Wirral